Birmingham Snow Hill may refer to:

Birmingham Snow Hill railway station, in Birmingham, England
Snowhill, mixed use development in Birmingham, England
Snow Hill Tunnel (Birmingham), railway tunnel in Birmingham, England